Krzewno may refer to the following places in Poland:

Krzewno, Warmian-Masurian Voivodeship
Krzewno, West Pomeranian Voivodeship